John Steen (July 28, 1874 – August 21, 1959) was a North Dakota public servant and politician with the Republican Party. He served as the North Dakota State Treasurer from 1915 to 1918 and again from 1921 to 1924. He then served as the North Dakota State Auditor from 1925 to 1934. Prior to serving as Auditor and Treasurer, he was in the North Dakota House of Representatives from 1907 to 1910. He died in Bismarck in 1959 at age 85.

Notes

1874 births
1959 deaths
North Dakota State Auditors
State treasurers of North Dakota
Members of the North Dakota House of Representatives